The second season of the American television situation comedy Leave It to Beaver premiered on October 2, 1958 and concluded on June 25, 1959. It consisted of 39 episodes shot in black-and-white, each running approximately 25 minutes in length. This was the first season that the show was originally aired on ABC after the first season was televised on CBS.

Episodes

References 

 Applebaum, Irwyn. The World According to Beaver. TV Books, 1998. .
 IMDb: Leave It to Beaver. Season 2.
 Leave It to Beaver: Season 2. DVD. Universal Studios Home Entertainment, 2006.
 Mathers, Jerry....And Jerry Mathers as "The Beaver". Berkley Boulevard Books, 1998. .

2